Love Letters from Engadin or Love Letters from the Engadine is a 1938 German romantic comedy film directed by Luis Trenker and Werner Klingler and starring Trenker, Carla Rust and Erika von Thellmann. It contains elements of the mountain film genre for which Trenker was best known. It is set in London and in the Engadin valley in the Swiss Alps, where much of the location shooting took place. Interiors were shot at the Sievering and Schönbrunn Studios in Vienna, which had recently been annexed by Germany. The film's sets were designed by the art director Fritz Maurischat. It was distributed by Terra Film.

Synopsis
The manager of a ski resort decides to raise money by writing love letters on behalf of his popular ski instructor to various former pupils asking them to visit the resort again and donate to new facilities. This causes complications when one of his former students in London breaks off her engagement to an aristocrat, having discovered he is marrying her for her fortune, and travels out to Switzerland accompanied by a female friend.

Main cast
 Luis Trenker as Toni Anewanter
 Carla Rust as Dorothy Baxter
 Erika von Thellmann as Anni Anewanter, Tonis Schwester
 Charlott Daudert as Constance Farrington
 Paul Heidemann as Lord Horace Baxter, Dorothys Vater
 Robert Dorsay as Jack, Kammerdienter
 Otto Wernicke as Thomas Viertinger, Hotelier
 Umberto Sacripante as Dr. Sacripanti
 Anton Pointner as Amtsrichter Rung

References

Bibliography 
 
 Klaus, Ulrich J. Deutsche Tonfilme: Jahrgang 1938. Klaus-Archiv, 1988.

External links 
 

1938 films
German romantic comedy films
1938 romantic comedy films
1930s German-language films
Films directed by Luis Trenker
Films directed by Werner Klingler
Films of Nazi Germany
Terra Film films
Films set in London
Films set in the Alps
Skiing films
German black-and-white films
1930s German films
Films shot at Schönbrunn Studios
Films shot at Sievering Studios